Mananabas is a 2001 Philippine action film co-written and directed by Cesar Montano, who stars as the title role.

Cast
 Cesar Montano as Lt. Miguel Marasigan
 Jo Canonizado as Sabrina Wilson
 Rommel Montano as Sgt. Aragon
 Daniel Fernando as Col. Rolando Garcia
 Spanky Manikan as Gen. Tomas Roxas
 Richard Merck as Military Groom
 Sammy Lagmay as Boyet
 Bon Vibar as Gen. Fred Torre
 Jeffrey Tam as Ting
 Mandy Ochoa as Maj. Paterno
 Mike Magat as Capt. Reyes
 Nicole Hofer as Nelia Marasigan
 Mina Bernales as Village Bride
 Cris Aguilar as Dagul
 Joel Apalla as Bungo
 Jerry Lopez as Hapon
 Jess Sanchez as Kulog
 Jun Collao as Maj. Estacio
 Sammuel Ebaristo as Pangil
 Cris Vertido as Imam
 RJ Leyran as Bride's Father
 Kevin Meyer as Paul Wilson
 Obet Tadiaman as Obet

References

External links

2001 films
2001 action films
Filipino-language films
Philippine action films
Maverick Films films
Films directed by Cesar Montano